Singapore participated in the 2017 Southeast Asian Games in Malaysia from 19 to 30 August 2017. It was held in the capital Kuala Lumpur and its surrounding areas as well as Langkawi for the Sailing competition.

Competitors
A total of 569 athletes competed in 35 sports during this edition.

Medal summary
A total of 188 medals were won at the Games, inclusive of 57 (now 58) Golds making this the best away Games performance.

Medal by sport

Source:

Medal by Date

References

External links
 

2017
Southeast Asian Games
Nations at the 2017 Southeast Asian Games